Jazz Rhythm is a 1930 short animated film distributed by Columbia Pictures. The film is part of a series featuring the comic strip character Krazy Kat.

Plot
Sports aficionados from faraway come to a stadium to watch an event. Although the event features a boxing ring, the event is not a boxing match. Rather, it's a contest between two pianists playing animated pianos. One of them is Krazy Kat who uses a grand piano. His opponent is a lion who uses an upright piano.

The lion is first to play. Despite getting some disturbance from a passing bee, the lion manages to perform without flaws.

Krazy is next to perform. Krazy also performs perfectly, thanks to not being disrupted.

After the pianists performed, they rest in their corners like boxers who been through a tough fight. Each of them has a cornerman who is a rat, and tries to keep them cool.

Moments later the third round begins. This time it's a boxing match between the two pianos as the instruments trade punches. After some exchange, Krazy's piano comes out the winner. Krazy celebrates by playing his piano again. The lion and the other piano, despite being bested, join Krazy's play minutes later.

See also
 Krazy Kat filmography

References

External links
Jazz Rhythm at the Big Cartoon Database

1930 films
1930 animated films
American black-and-white films
Krazy Kat shorts
Columbia Pictures short films
1930s American animated films
American animated short films
Jazz films
Columbia Pictures animated short films
Screen Gems short films
1930s English-language films